VolgaTelecom is a defunct Russian telecommunications company that was formed in 2002 after the Svyaz'invest Company in Moscow decided to reorganise 72 different regional service providers into seven large interregional companies.

Headquartered in Nizhny Novgorod, the company was one of the largest operators, providing mobile and internet communications in  the Volga Federal District. As of the end of 2006, it provided services to 5,123 million users. In 2011, the company was absorbed by Rostelecom — Russia’s largest domestic provider of digital services.

Operations

Regional branches
Chuvash Republic Branch
Kirov Branch
Mari El Republic Branch
Mordovian Republic Branch
Nizhniy Novgorod Branch
Orenburg Branch
Penza Branch
Samara Branch
Saratov Branch
Udmurt Republic Branch
Ulyanovsk Oblast Branch

References

External links
VolgaTelecom - Russian language, English language
Svyazinvest - Russian language, English language

Cable television companies of Russia
Svyazinvest
Companies based in Nizhny Novgorod
Telecommunications companies established in 2002
Russian brands
Companies formerly listed on the Moscow Exchange
Defunct companies of Russia